The 2021–22 Atlantic Coast Conference men's basketball season began with practices in October 2021, followed by the start of the 2021–22 NCAA Division I men's basketball season in November. Conference play began in December 2021 and concluded March 8–12, 2022, with the 2022 ACC men's basketball tournament at Barclays Center in Brooklyn, New York. This was the 68th season of Atlantic Coast Conference basketball.

Head coaches

Coaching changes 

Roy Williams retired after serving as the head coach at North Carolina for 18 seasons. Hubert Davis was hired as the next head coach of North Carolina.

Boston College fired Jim Christian in the middle of the season, after leading the team to a 3–13 record.  Christian's overall record with Boston College was 78–132 and 26–94 in ACC play.  Scott Spinelli served as interim coach until the end of the season.  After the season Earl Grant was hired as the new head coach.

Coaches 

Notes:
 Year at school includes 2021–22 season.
 Overall and ACC records are from the time at current school and are through the end of the 2020–21 season.
 NCAA tournament appearances are from the time at current school only.
 NCAA Final Fours and championship include time at other schools

Preseason

Recruiting classes

Notes:
 Rankings are up to date as of November 3, 2021
 NR stands for not ranked.

Preseason watchlists

Preseason polls

ACC Preseason Media poll

The Preseason Media Poll and Preseason All-ACC teams were voted on after a tipoff event held at the Charlotte Marriott City Center in Charlotte, North Carolina on October 12, 2021.  Voting for the polls opened on October 13 and concluded on October 18.  The polls and teams were announced on the ACC Network on October 19, 2021.  Duke was selected the preseason favorite.

Preseason poll

 Duke – 1,132 (47)
 Florida State – 1,034 (14)
 North Carolina – 1,001 (5)
 Virginia – 949 (9)
 Virginia Tech – 857 (5)
 Louisville – 791 (1)
 Syracuse – 781
 Notre Dame – 599
 NC State – 555
 Georgia Tech – 524
 Clemson – 430
 Miami – 428
 Wake Forest – 274
 Pitt – 253
 Boston College – 112
First-place votes shown in parenthesis.

Preseason All-ACC teams

ACC preseason player of the year 

 Paolo Banchero – Duke (28)
 Keve Aluma – Virginia Tech (16)
 Buddy Boeheim – Syracuse (13)
 Armando Bacot – North Carolina (12)
 Kihei Clark – Virginia (5)
 Wendell Moore Jr. – Duke (3)
 Caleb Love – North Carolina(2)
 Mark Williams – Duke (2)

ACC Preseason Freshman of the year

 Paolo Banchero – Duke (64)
 Trevor Keels – Duke (5)
 Terquavion Smith – NC State (3)
 Dontrez Styles – North Carolina (3)
 Igor Miličić Jr. – Virginia (3)
 Wooga Poplar – Miami (1)
 Benny Williams – Syracuse (1)
 Cameron Hildreth – Wake Forest (1)

Early season tournaments

Source:

Regular season

Rankings

Conference matrix
This table summarizes the head-to-head results between teams in conference play. Each team will play 20 conference games, and at least 1 against each opponent.  The full conference schedule was announced on September 16, 2021.

Player of the week
Throughout the conference regular season, the Atlantic Coast Conference offices named one or two Players of the week and one or two Rookies of the week.

Records against other conferences
2021–22 records against non-conference foes through games played on January 20, 2022. Records shown for regular season only.

Postseason

ACC tournament

  2022 Atlantic Coast Conference Basketball Tournament was held at the Barclays Center in Brooklyn, New York.

* – Denotes overtime period

NCAA tournament

National Invitation tournament

Honors and awards

All-Americans

To earn "consensus" status, a player must win honors based on a point system computed from the four different all-America teams. The point system consists of three points for first team, two points for second team and one point for third team. No honorable mention or fourth team or lower are used in the computation. The top five totals plus ties are first team and the next five plus ties are second team.

ACC Awards

Source:

NBA draft

The ACC had seven players selected in the 2022 NBA Draft.  Their six players selected in the first round was the most of any conference.  Paolo Banchero was selected First Overall, becoming the ACC's twelfth number one overall pick.  The ACC extended a streak of first round selections to 34 consecutive years, and for 14 straight drafts they have had at least three players selected in the first round.

Attendance

References